Literary Association of the Friends of Poland is a British organisation of solidarity with Poles, founded February 25, 1832 in United Kingdom by the Scottish poet Thomas Campbell and German lawyer Adolphus Bach. Although the creation of the LAFP was the result of deep pro-Polish sympathies of Campbell and the whole contemporary British public opinion, Prince Adam Jerzy Czartoryski did attend a dinner for the association, in Edinburgh 1835 along with Count Zamoyski.

History
Thomas Campbell was the Society's first President, and the first secretary was a young Anglo-Irishman, Richard Graves Meredith. The main goal of the society was to sustain the interest of British public opinion in the Polish question after the failure of the November Uprising. Its members included many influential British political figures, e.g. Sir Francis Burdett, Dudley Ryder, Robert Cutlar Fergusson, Lord Dudley Coutts Stuart, Thomas Wentworth Beaumont, Daniel O'Connell, Thomas Attwood and Patrick Stuart.

There were also a number of regional associations created in 1832 which supported the main association in London: these were: Hull Literary Polish Society (founded in July 1832), Glasgow Polish Association (founded in October 1832), and the Birmingham Polish Association (founded in October 1832).

Maude Ashurst Biggs and her mother were enthusiastic supporters in the 1880s. Biggs published English translations of Adam Mickiewicz's epic poetry. In 1882 she published her translation of Mickiewicz's epic poem Konrad Wallenrod which had somehow not been censored by the Russians and in 1885 she published her translation of another of his epic poems Master Thaddeus, or, The Last Foray in Lithuania to assist the cause.

References

Further reading
 L. Gadon, Z życia Polaków we Francyi : rzut oka na 50-letnie koleje Towarzystwa Historyczno-Literackiego w Paryżu, 1832-1882, 1883 
 K. Marchlewicz, Propolski lobbing w Izbach Gmin i Lordów w latach trzydziestych i czterdziestych XIX wieku, w: Przegląd Historyczny, 2005, nr 1.

See also
Historical and Literary Society
Polish Library in Paris

Great Emigration
History of Great Britain
Poland–United Kingdom relations